The Wisconsin Department of Justice is a state law enforcement agency with jurisdiction throughout the state of Wisconsin. Its headquarters are in Madison, the state capital, with main offices in the Risser Justice Center in downtown Madison. The Attorney General of Wisconsin oversees the agency. The attorney general is Josh Kaul, who was elected to his first four-year term in November, 2018, and assumed the office on January 7, 2019. The WDoJ manages the state's three crime labs, and investigates major crimes involving, among other things, illegal drugs, fugitives, public corruption, official misconduct, organized crime, domestic terrorism, Medicaid fraud and patient abuse.

Responsibilities
The agency provides legal advice and representation, criminal investigation, and other law enforcement services for the state. It represents the state in civil cases and handles criminal cases that reach the Wisconsin Court of Appeals or the Wisconsin Supreme Court. It also represents the state in criminal cases on appeal in federal courts and participates with other states in federal cases that are important to Wisconsin. The department provides legal representation in lower courts when expressly authorized by law or requested by the governor, either house of the legislature, or a state agency head. It also represents state agencies in court reviews of their administrative decisions. The department consists of four divisions and one office: the Division of Criminal Investigation, Division of Law Enforcement Services, Division of Legal Services, Division of Management Services and the Office of Crime Victim Services.
The agency also pursues ongoing anti-opioid messaging through the Dose of Reality outreach.

State crime labs
The Wisconsin Department of Justice maintains three state crimes labs, located in Madison, Milwaukee, and Wausau.

Anti-terrorism 
In early 2009 the Wisconsin DoJ completed its second Terrorism Liaison Officer's (TLO) training at the Volk Field Air National Guard Base. TLOs are local law enforcement officers, fire fighters, EMS personnel, National Guard personnel, and county emergency managers. The 101 new and existing 61 TLO's have been trained on the most recent terrorism and crime issues, trend analysis, and the proper procedures for receiving and disseminating information to field personnel.

See also

List of law enforcement agencies in Wisconsin
Wisconsin Board of Commissioners of Public Lands

References

External links
 Wisconsin Department of Justice
 Division of Criminal Investigation
 Wisconsin Clearinghouse for Missing & Exploited Children & Adults
 Wisconsin DoJ at wilenet.org

State law enforcement agencies of Wisconsin
Government of Wisconsin